Widney Alumni House is a Los Angeles Historic-Cultural Monument (No. 70) on the campus of the University of Southern California. It is the oldest university building in Southern California, having been in continuous use since 1880. Widney Alumni House has been designated as a California Historical Landmark (No. 536), as Original Building of the University of Southern California.  The landmark plaque states,

Dedicated on September 4, 1880, this original building of the University of Southern California has been in use continuously for educational purposes since its doors were first opened to students on October 6, 1880, by the university's first president, Marion McKinley Bovard. The building was constructed on land donated by Ozro W. Childs, John G. Downey and Isaias W. Hellman under the guiding hand of Judge Robert M. Widney, the university's leading founder.

See also
List of Los Angeles Historic-Cultural Monuments in South Los Angeles

References

External links
Photograph of Widney Alumni House
Big Orange Landmarks article on Widney Alumni House

Buildings and structures in Los Angeles
California Historical Landmarks
Los Angeles Historic-Cultural Monuments
School buildings completed in 1880
University of Southern California buildings and structures
University Park, Los Angeles